La Mata de Morella is a town in the province of Castellón, Valencian Community, Spain, pertaining to the region of the Ports of Morella. , it has 192 inhabitants.

Ports (comarca)